Nyovani Janet Madise is the current Director of Research and Sustainable Development Policies and Head of the Malawi office of the African Institute for Development Policy. She is an advisor to the World Health Organization and a former professor at the University of Southampton in Demography and Social Statistics. Nyovani has over 100 peer-reviewed research publications that focus on global health issues to highlight the influence of social and economic factors on health in low-income countries.

She was a key advisor to Melinda French Gates regarding family planning in Africa as Gates for both her 2014 TEDx in Berlin and her London Family Planning Summit in 2012. In 2007, Madise addressed the 40th Session of the United Nations Commission on Population and Development in New York, highlighting the importance of understanding and investing in the health and education of Africa’s next generation.

Education and work 

Nyovani Madise was born in Blantyre, Malawi, to a father who was an accountant and a mother who worked in broadcasting. She attended the University of Malawi, completing an undergraduate in Mathematics and Statistics in 1983. She moved to the UK to pursue a Master of Science degree and then a PhD in social statistics at the University of Southampton.

In 2016, she received an honorary higher doctoral degree (DSc) from the University of Aberdeen in recognition of her contributions to research on healthcare in Africa. Madise has previously worked as a Lecturer at the University of Malawi and as a Senior Research Scientist at the African Population and Health Research Center in Kenya. She has held many senior management roles, including Associate Dean of Research in a large faculty at Southampton, Deputy Head of School; University Lead for Equality, Diversity, and Inclusion; Director of Public Policy, and Director of the Centre for Global Health, Population, Poverty, and Policy at Southampton.

Advisory experience 
Professor Nyovani Madise is one of the 15 scientists appointed by the UN Secretary-General to write the 2023 Global Sustainable Development Report. The report will be launched as the world approaches the halfway point of the 2030 Agenda and struggles to rebuild in the aftermath (or in the midst) of the COVID-19 pandemic. It seeks to highlight solutions that can accelerate progress on the SDGs that will be urgently needed. She was also appointed Co-Chair of the next Global Environment Outlook Assessment Report. 

Nyovani is a Vice-Chair of the Population Council Board of Trustees, where she leads special projects. She is also a Trustee of the Liverpool School of Tropical Medicine. 

She is the Board Director of AmplifyChange LTD, which supports advocacy and activist groups working on these five priority areas, such as: (i) Eliminating gender-based violence, (ii) Removing barriers to safe abortion, (iii) Challenging stigma and discrimination, (iv)Improving sexual health of young people, and (v) Increasing access to reproductive health.

Nyovani sits on the Advisory Group of Population and Public Health Early Career Advisory Group. She is the current Vice-Chair of the University of Malawi Council.

Scholarship

"Is Poverty a Driver for Risky Sexual Behaviour? Evidence from National Surveys of Adolescents in four African Countries" (2007) Link 

Madise co-authored this article with Eliya Zulu and James Ciera.  The research was motivated by two factors; firstly, the high prevalence of HIV among young people in Africa. Secondly, the fact that there did not seem to be an academic consensus on the relationship between poverty and risky sexual behaviour in Africa; the results would depend on the type of data collected, the number of participants and what the working definition of sexual intercourse was. At the Macro level research has shown that poorer countries suffer more than wealthier ones when there is an HIV epidemic. On a Micro level though some of the wealthiest countries in Sub-Saharan Africa such as Botswana and South Africa have the highest rates of HIV in the region. This is counterintuitive to data at the Macro level which supports the fact that poorer countries will likely have fewer resources to invest in prevention services. Finally, on an grass root level, there seems to be a positive relationship between wealth and the prevalence of HIV on the African continent. The spread of HIV in African countries is linked to mobility. Wealthier people will travel and expose themselves more to people with HIV thus facilitating the spread.

To get to the root of this issue Madise, Zulu and Cierra set out to address this by collecting data from four different countries Burkina Faso, Malawi, Uganda and Ghana with over 19500 participants between the ages of 12 and 19.  These countries were chosen because they would provide different levels and contexts of HIV prevalence. Their results showed that girls who are in the wealthiest quintiles in Malawi, Burkina Faso and Ghana had later sexual debut compared to those who are poor.  This was not the case for Uganda. Furthermore, wealthy adolescents were more likely to have used condoms in their last sexual act. Finally in Uganda and Ghana wealth status had a positive relationship with the likelihood to have more partners.  The report that poverty increases the likelihood of poor girls having sex is consistent with research that has shown that this is done in exchange for gifts and money.  The paper also highlights that adolescents who are in school are more likely to engage in sexual intercourse before those who are not in school.  The paper concludes that poverty influences the likelihood of risky sexual behaviour, especially among young females.

"Is There an Urban Advantage in Child Survival in Sub-Saharan Africa? Evidence From 18 Countries in the 1990s" (2011) Link 
Madise co-authored this article with Philippe Bocquier and Eliya Msiyaphazi Zulu. Observing the pattern of higher child mortality of rural-to-urban migrants compared with urban nonmigrants, Madise, Bocquier, and Zulu compared DHS data from 18 African countries to argue that it is not necessarily the place of residence but access to services and economic opportunities that matter for child survival. They used DHS data collected from 18 African countries between 1995 and 2001 and examined the migration status of the mother and compositional effects, such as differences in socioeconomic status, sanitation, and individual child characteristics.

Comparing rural-to-urban migrants with urban natives, migrants only do worse than natives in less than one-half of the countries—therefore, the perceived disadvantage in child survival of urban migrants relative to urban natives is not universal. Those moving from rural to urban areas may be relatively wealthier or those with better access to health services than other rural inhabitants. On the other hand, children of urban dwellers who migrate to rural areas have very high mortality while in urban areas relative to other urban inhabitants, because they tend to be the poorest slum dwellers and those without access to services. Their findings confirm the view that child mortality is lower in urban areas than in rural areas, but if rural households have access to sanitation and services, and if their economic well-being improves, rural childhood mortality can decline to levels that cancel out the so-called urban advantage.

"Protecting female migrants from forced sex and HIV infection" (2017) Link 
In this paper, Madise and Bernard Onyango begin by assessing the issue from a macro-level pointing out the fact that 30% of women globally have been victims of abuse perpetrated by someone that they know. This abuse has negative emotional, mental and health effects for women. Madise and Onyango cite the paper by Julie Pannetier and colleagues in The Lancet Public Health, which shows that some migrants to Europe are infected with HIV when they reach their destination. This is contrary to popular belief that many of these migrants from sub-Saharan Africa are infected with the epidemic before they arrive.  The authors point out that women who migrate are usually low skilled workers fleeing home countries because of poverty and high risk of sexual violence.

A report by the UNHCR suggests that some of these women are forced to pay for their transportation and documentation to get to Europe through exchanging sexual favours.  A lack of basic needs such as shelter and healthcare when arriving in Europe increases the risk of being sexually abused because they are vulnerable.  The vulnerability is heightened by poverty which increases inequality and leads to a power imbalance between the rich and poor.  This power imbalance will lead to a woman's depreciated view of her sense of self-worth and ultimately lead to her transactional sex. The paper concludes that since females form a significant proportion of people who migrate, there is a need for a gender-based analysis when designing migration regulations and policies.

"Level the playing field for science in the global South" (2020) Link 
In this article, Madise highlights the need for scientific cooperation as it propels global development. The current COVID-19 emergency demonstrates, if more evidence were needed, how interconnected the world is and how vital it is for scientists to continue to work together across national and regional boundaries. Despite the economic, political and social impacts of the crisis, this World Science Day for Peace and Development, we should reflect on the progress made in global development as a result of scientific cooperation.

In low- and middle-income countries (LMICs), we have seen a great increase in productivity and in the quality of research and innovation. These include major multi-country clinical trials and advances in health, mobile technology and data sharing, and the spread of affordable, sustainable energy technologies. This progress has been pushed forward by the Sustainable Development Goals, agreed by all countries in 2015 as a “shared blueprint for peace and prosperity for people and the planet, now and into the future”. Countries have chosen which of the 17 SDGs to focus on, and this has created coalitions of shared interest around these goals.

Selected works 
 Monica Akinyi Magadi, Nyovani Janet Madise, Roberto Nascimento Rodrigues, 2000. "Frequency and timing of antenatal care in Kenya: explaining the variations between women of different communities"
 Priscilla A Akwara, Nyovani Janet Madise, Andrew Hinde, 2003. "Perception of risk of HIV/AIDS and sexual behaviour in Kenya"
 Rob Stephenson, Angela Baschieri, Steve Clements, Monique Hennink, Nyovani Madise, 2006. "Contextual influences on the use of health facilities for childbirth in Africa"
 Elizabeth W Kimani-Murage, Nyovani J Madise, Jean-Christophe Fotso, Catherine Kyobutungi, Martin K Mutua, Tabither M Gitau, Nelly Yatich, 2011." Patterns and determinants of breastfeeding and complementary feeding practices in urban informal settlements, Nairobi Kenya  Authors"
 Ann M Moore, Kofi Awusabo-Asare, Nyovani Madise, Johannes John-Langba, Akwasi Kumi-Kyereme, 2007. "Coerced first sex among adolescent girls in sub-Saharan Africa: prevalence and context"
 Guy M Poppy, Sosten Chiotha, Felix Eigenbrod, Celia A Harvey, Miroslav Honzák, Malcolm D Hudson, Andy Jarvis, NJ Madise, Kate Schreckenberg, CM Shackleton, F Villa, Terence P Dawson, 2014. "Food security in a perfect storm: using the ecosystem services framework to increase understanding"

References 

Living people
21st-century Malawian economists
Alumni of the University of Southampton
Year of birth missing (living people)
Academics of the University of Southampton
Health economists